List of aerial victories of Otto Könnecke
 
Otto Könnecke (1892-1956) was a German First World War fighter ace credited with 35 confirmed and two unconfirmed aerial victories. After service on the Italian Front with Jagdstaffel 25, he transferred to Jagdstaffel 5 in France to score 33 more victories. His victories, added to those of his two sergeant pilot friends Josef Mai and Fritz Rumey, totaled over 100, and comprised about half the squadron's victory roll. They were dubbed The Golden Triumvirate.

Otto Könnecke's victories are reported in chronological order, which is not necessarily the order or dates the victories were confirmed by headquarters.

This list is complete for entries, though obviously not for all details. Background data was abstracted from Above the Lines: The Aces and Fighter Units of the German Air Service, Naval Air Service and Flanders Marine Corps, 1914–1918, p. 148; and The Aerodrome webpage on Otto Könnecke . Abbreviations were expanded by the editor creating this list.

References

Aerial victories of Könnecke, Otto
Könnecke, Otto